Allériot is a commune in the Saône-et-Loire department in the Bourgogne-Franche-Comté region in eastern France.

Geography
The commune lies east of the Saône near Chalon-sur-Saône.

Population

See also
Communes of the Saône-et-Loire department

References

Communes of Saône-et-Loire